The Great Northern War (1700–1721) was a conflict in which a coalition led by the Tsardom of Russia successfully contested the supremacy of the Swedish Empire in Northern, Central and Eastern Europe. The initial leaders of the anti-Swedish alliance were Peter I of Russia, Frederick IV of Denmark–Norway and Augustus II the Strong of Saxony–Poland–Lithuania. Frederick IV and Augustus II were defeated by Sweden, under Charles XII, and forced out of the alliance in 1700 and 1706 respectively, but rejoined it in 1709 after the defeat of Charles XII at the Battle of Poltava. George I of Great Britain and the Electorate of Hanover joined the coalition in 1714 for Hanover and in 1717 for Britain, and Frederick William I of Brandenburg-Prussia joined it in 1715.

Charles XII led the Swedish army. Swedish allies included Holstein-Gottorp, several Polish magnates under Stanislaus I Leszczyński (1704–1710) and Cossacks under the Ukrainian Hetman Ivan Mazepa (1708–1710). The Ottoman Empire temporarily hosted Charles XII of Sweden and intervened against Peter I.

The war began when an alliance of Denmark–Norway, Saxony and Russia, sensing an opportunity as Sweden was ruled by the young Charles XII, declared war on the Swedish Empire and launched a threefold attack on Swedish Holstein-Gottorp, Swedish Livonia, and Swedish Ingria. Sweden parried the Danish and Russian attacks at Travendal (August 1700) and Narva (November 1700) respectively, and in a counter-offensive pushed Augustus II's forces through the Polish–Lithuanian Commonwealth to Saxony, dethroning Augustus on the way (September 1706) and forcing him to acknowledge defeat in the Treaty of Altranstädt (October 1706). The treaty also secured the extradition and execution of Johann Reinhold Patkul, architect of the alliance seven years earlier. Meanwhile, the forces of Peter I had recovered from defeat at Narva and gained ground in Sweden's Baltic provinces, where they cemented Russian access to the Baltic Sea by founding Saint Petersburg in 1703. Charles XII moved from Saxony into Russia to confront Peter, but the campaign ended in 1709 with the destruction of the main Swedish army at the decisive Battle of Poltava (in present-day Ukraine) and Charles' exile in the Ottoman town of Bender. The Ottoman Empire defeated the Russian-Moldavian army in the Pruth River Campaign, but that peace treaty was in the end without great consequence to Russia's position.

After Poltava, the anti-Swedish coalition revived and subsequently Hanover and Prussia joined it. The remaining Swedish forces in plague-stricken areas south and east of the Baltic Sea were evicted, with the last city, Tallinn, falling in the autumn of 1710. The coalition members partitioned most of the Swedish dominions among themselves, destroying the Swedish dominium maris baltici. Sweden proper was invaded from the west by Denmark–Norway and from the east by Russia, which had occupied Finland by 1714. Sweden defeated the Danish invaders at the Battle of Helsingborg. Charles XII opened up a Norwegian front but was killed in the Siege of Fredriksten in 1718.

The war ended with the defeat of Sweden, leaving Russia as the new dominant power in the Baltic region and as a new major force in European politics. The Western powers, Great Britain and France, became caught up in the separate War of the Spanish Succession (1701–1714), which broke out over the Bourbon Philip of Anjou's succession to the Spanish throne and a possible joining of France and Spain. The formal conclusion of the Great Northern War came with the Swedish-Hanoverian and Swedish-Prussian Treaties of Stockholm (1719), the Dano-Swedish Treaty of Frederiksborg (1720), and the Russo-Swedish Treaty of Nystad (1721). By these treaties Sweden ceded its exemption from the Sound Dues and lost the Baltic provinces and the southern part of Swedish Pomerania. The peace treaties also ended its alliance with Holstein-Gottorp. Hanover gained Bremen-Verden, Brandenburg-Prussia incorporated the Oder estuary (Stettin Lagoons), Russia secured the Baltic Provinces, and Denmark strengthened its position in Schleswig-Holstein. In Sweden, the absolute monarchy had come to an end with the death of Charles XII, and Sweden's Age of Liberty began.

Background 

Between 1560 and 1658, Sweden created a Baltic empire centred on the Gulf of Finland and comprising the provinces of Karelia, Ingria, Estonia, and Livonia. During the Thirty Years' War Sweden gained tracts in Germany as well, including Western Pomerania, Wismar, the Duchy of Bremen, and Verden. During the same period, Sweden conquered Danish and Norwegian provinces north of the Sound (1645; 1658). These victories may be ascribed to a well-trained army, which despite its comparatively small size, was far more professional than most continental armies, and also to a modernization of administration (both civilian and military) in the course of the 17th century, which enabled the monarchy to harness the resources of the country and its empire effectively. Fighting in the field, the Swedish army (which during the Thirty Years' War contained more German and Scottish mercenaries than ethnic Swedes, but was administered by the Swedish Crown) was able, in particular, to make quick, sustained marches across large tracts of land and to maintain a high rate of small arms fire due to proficient military drill.

However, the Swedish state ultimately proved unable to support and maintain its army in a prolonged war. Campaigns on the continent had been proposed on the basis that the army would be financially self-supporting through plunder and taxation of newly gained land, a concept shared by most major powers of the period. The cost of the warfare proved to be much higher than the occupied countries could fund, and Sweden's coffers and resources in manpower were eventually drained in the course of long conflicts.

The foreign interventions in Russia during the Time of Troubles resulted in Swedish gains in the Treaty of Stolbovo (1617). The treaty deprived Russia of direct access to the Baltic Sea. Russian fortunes began to reverse in the final years of the 17th century, notably with the rise to power of Peter the Great, who looked to address the earlier losses and re-establish a Baltic presence. In the late 1690s, the adventurer Johann Patkul managed to ally Russia with Denmark and Saxony by the secret Treaty of Preobrazhenskoye, and in 1700 the three powers attacked.

Opposing parties

Swedish camp 
Charles XII of Sweden succeeded Charles XI of Sweden in 1697, aged 14. From his predecessor, he took over the Swedish Empire as an absolute monarch. Charles XI had tried to keep the empire out of wars, and concentrated on inner reforms such as reduction and allotment, which had strengthened the monarch's status and the empire's military abilities. Charles XII refrained from all kinds of luxury and alcohol and usage of the French language, since he considered these things decadent and superfluous. He preferred the life of an ordinary soldier on horseback, not that of contemporary baroque courts. He determinedly pursued his goal of dethroning his adversaries, whom he considered unworthy of their thrones due to broken promises, thereby refusing to take several chances to make peace. During the war, the most important Swedish commanders besides Charles XII were his close friend Carl Gustav Rehnskiöld, also Magnus Stenbock and Adam Ludwig Lewenhaupt.

Charles Frederick, son of Frederick IV, Duke of Holstein-Gottorp (a cousin of Charles XII) and Hedvig Sophia, daughter of Charles XI of Sweden, had been the Swedish heir since 1702. He claimed the throne upon Charles XII's death in 1718, but was supplanted by Ulrike Eleonora. Charles Frederick was married to a daughter of Peter I, Anna Petrovna.

Ivan Mazepa was a Ukrainian Cossack hetman who fought for Russia but defected to Charles XII in 1708. Mazepa died in 1709 in Ottoman exile.

Allied camp 

Peter the Great became Tsar in 1682 upon the death of his elder brother Feodor but did not become the actual ruler until 1689. He commenced reforming the country, turning the Russian tsardom into a modernized empire relying on trade and on a strong, professional army and navy. He greatly expanded the size of Russia during his reign while providing access to the Baltic, Black, and Caspian seas. Beside Peter, the principal Russian commanders were Aleksandr Danilovich Menshikov and Boris Sheremetev.

Augustus II the Strong, elector of Saxony and another cousin of Charles XII, gained the Polish crown after the death of King John III Sobieski in 1696. His ambitions to transform the Polish–Lithuanian Commonwealth into an absolute monarchy were not realized due to the zealous nature of the Polish nobility and the previously initiated laws that decreased the power of the monarch. His meeting with Peter the Great in Rawa Ruska in September 1698, where the plans to attack Sweden were made, became legendary for its decadence.

Frederick IV of Denmark-Norway, another cousin of Charles XII, succeeded Christian V in 1699 and continued his anti-Swedish policies. After the setbacks of 1700, he focused on transforming his state, an absolute monarchy, in a manner similar to Charles XI of Sweden. He did not achieve his main goal: to regain the former eastern Danish provinces lost to Sweden in the course of the 17th century. He was not able to keep northern Swedish Pomerania, Danish from 1712 to 1715. He did put an end to the Swedish threat south of Denmark. He ended Sweden's exemption from the Sound Dues (transit taxes/tariffs on cargo moved between the North Sea and the Baltic Sea).

Frederick William I entered the war as elector of Brandenburg and king in Prussia—the royal title had been secured in 1701. He was determined to gain the Oder estuary with its access to the Baltic Sea for the Brandenburgian core areas, which had been a state goal for centuries.

George I of the House of Hanover, elector of Hanover and, since 1714, king of Great Britain and of Ireland, took the opportunity to connect his landlocked German electorate to the North Sea.

Army size 
In 1700, Charles XII had a standing army of 77,000 men (based on annual training). By 1707 this number had swollen to at least 120,000 despite casualties.

Russia was able to mobilize a larger army but could not put all of it into action simultaneously. The Russian mobilization system was ineffective and the expanding nation needed to be defended in many locations. A grand mobilization covering Russia's vast territories would have been unrealistic. Peter I tried to raise his army's morale to Swedish levels. Denmark contributed 20,000 men in their invasion of Holstein-Gottorp and more on other fronts. Poland and Saxony together could mobilize at least 100,000 men.

1700: Denmark, Riga and Narva 

Frederik IV of Denmark–Norway directed his first attack against Sweden's ally Holstein-Gottorp. In March 1700, a Danish army laid siege to Tönning. Simultaneously, Augustus II's forces advanced through Swedish Livonia, captured Dünamünde and laid siege to Riga.

Charles XII of Sweden first focused on attacking Denmark. The Swedish navy was able to outmaneuver the Danish Sound blockade and deploy an army near the Danish capital, Copenhagen. At the same time, a combined Anglo-Dutch fleet had also set course towards Denmark. Together with the Swedish fleet, they carried out a bombardment of Copenhagen from 20 to 26 July. This surprise move and pressure by the Maritime Powers (England and the Dutch Republic) forced Denmark–Norway to withdraw from the war in August 1700 according to the terms of the Peace of Travendal.

Charles XII was now able to speedily deploy his army to the eastern coast of the Baltic Sea and face his remaining enemies: besides the army of Augustus II in Livonia, an army of Russian tsar Peter I was already on its way to invade Swedish Ingria, where it laid siege to Narva in October. In November, the Russian and Swedish armies met at the First Battle of Narva where the Russians suffered a crushing defeat.

After the dissolution of the first coalition through the peace of Travendal and with the victory at Narva; the Swedish chancellor, Benedict Oxenstjerna, attempted to use the bidding for the favour of Sweden by France and the Maritime Powers (then on the eve of the War of the Spanish Succession) to end the war and make Charles an arbiter of Europe.

1701–1706: Poland-Lithuania and Saxony 

Charles XII then turned south to meet Augustus II, Elector of Saxony, King of Poland and Grand Duke of Lithuania. The Polish–Lithuanian Commonwealth was formally neutral at this point, as Augustus started the war as an Elector of Saxony. Disregarding Polish negotiation proposals supported by the Swedish parliament, Charles crossed into the Commonwealth and decisively defeated the Saxe-Polish forces in the Battle of Klissow in 1702 and in the Battle of Pultusk in 1703. This successful invasion enabled Charles XII to dethrone Augustus II and coerce the Polish sejm to replace him with Stanislaus Leszczyński in 1704. August II resisted, still possessing control of his native Saxony, but was decisively defeated at the Battle of Fraustadt in 1706, a battle sometimes compared to the Ancient Battle of Cannae due to the Swedish forces' use of double envelopment, with a deadly result for the Saxon army. In 1706, after a Swedish invasion of Saxony, August II was forced to sign the Treaty of Altranstädt in which he made peace with the Swedish Empire, renounced his claims to the Polish crown, accepted Stanislaus Leszczyński as king, and ended his alliance with Russia. Patkul was also extradited and executed by breaking on the wheel in 1707, an incident which, given his diplomatic immunity, infuriated opinion against the Swedish king, who was then expected to win the war against the only hostile power remaining, Tsar Peter's Russia.

1702–1710: Russia and the Baltic provinces 

The Battle of Narva dealt a severe setback to Peter the Great, but the shift of Charles XII's army to the Polish-Saxon threat soon afterward provided him with an opportunity to regroup and regain territory in the Baltic provinces. Russian victories at Erastfer and Nöteborg (Shlisselburg) provided access to Ingria in 1703, where Peter captured the Swedish fortress of Nyen, guarding the mouth of the River Neva. Thanks to General Adam Ludwig Lewenhaupt, whose outnumbered forces fended the Russians off in the battles of Gemäuerthof and Jakobstadt, Sweden was able to maintain control of most of its Baltic provinces. Before going to war, Peter had made preparations for a navy and a modern-style army, based primarily on infantry drilled in the use of firearms.

The Nyen fortress was soon abandoned and demolished by Peter, who built nearby a superior fortress as a beginning to the city of Saint Petersburg. By 1704, other fortresses were situated on the island of Kotlin and the sand flats to its south. These became known as Kronstadt and Kronslot. The Swedes attempted a raid on the Neva fort on 13 July 1704 with ships and landing armies, but the Russian fortifications held. In 1705, repeated Swedish attacks were made against Russian fortifications in the area, to little effect. A major attack on 15 July 1705 ended in the deaths of more than 500 Swedish men, or a third of its forces.

In view of continued failure to check Russian consolidation, and with declining manpower, Sweden opted to blockade Saint Petersburg in 1705. In the summer of 1706, Swedish General Georg Johan Maidel crossed the Neva with 4,000 troops and defeated an opposing Russian force, but made no move on Saint Petersburg. Later in the autumn Peter I led an army of 20,000 men in an attempt to take the Swedish town and fortress of Viborg. However, bad roads proved impassable to his heavy siege guns. The troops, who arrived on 12 October, therefore had to abandon the siege after only a few days. On 12 May 1708, a Russian galley fleet made a lightning raid on Borgå and managed to return to Kronslot just one day before the Swedish battle fleet returned to the blockade, after being delayed by unfavourable winds.

In August 1708, a Swedish army of 12,000 men under General Georg Henrik Lybecker attacked Ingria, crossing the Neva from the north. They met stubborn resistance, ran out of supplies and, after reaching the Gulf of Finland west of Kronstadt, had to be evacuated by sea between 10 and 17 October. Over 11,000 men were evacuated but more than 5000 horses were slaughtered, which crippled the mobility and offensive capability of the Swedish army in Finland for several years. Peter I took advantage of this by redeploying a large number of men from Ingria to Ukraine.

Charles spent the years 1702–06 in a prolonged struggle with Augustus II the Strong; he had already inflicted defeat on him at Riga in June 1701 and took Warsaw the following year, but trying to force a decisive defeat proved elusive. Russia left Poland in the spring of 1706, abandoning artillery but escaping from the pursuing Swedes, who stopped at Pinsk. Charles wanted not just to defeat the Commonwealth army but to depose Augustus, whom he regarded as especially treasonous, and have him replaced with someone who would be a Swedish ally, though this proved hard to achieve. After years of marches and fighting around Poland he finally had to invade Augustus' hereditary Saxony to take him out of the war. In the treaty of Altranstädt (1706), Augustus was finally forced to step down from the Polish throne, but Charles had already lost the valuable advantage of time over his main enemy in the east, Peter I, who then had the time to recover and build up an army that was both new and better.

At this point, in 1707, Peter offered to return everything he had so far occupied (essentially Ingria) except Saint Petersburg and the line of the Neva, to avoid a full-scale war, but Charles XII refused. Instead he initiated a march from Saxony to invade Russia. Though his primary goal was Moscow, the strength of his forces was sapped by the cold weather (the winter of 1708/09 being one of the most severe in modern European history) and Peter's use of scorched earth tactics. When the main army turned south to recover in Ukraine, the second army with supplies and reinforcements was intercepted and routed at Lesnaya—and so were the supplies and reinforcements of Swedish ally Ivan Mazepa in Baturyn. Charles was crushingly defeated by a larger Russian force under Peter in the Battle of Poltava and fled to the Ottoman Empire while the remains of his army surrendered at Perevolochna.

This shattering defeat in 1709 did not end the war, although it decided it. Denmark and Saxony joined the war again and Augustus the Strong, through the politics of Boris Kurakin, regained the Polish throne. Peter continued his campaigns in the Baltics, and eventually he built up a powerful navy. In 1710 the Russian forces captured Riga, at the time the most populated city in the Swedish realm, and Tallinn, evicting the Swedes from the Baltic provinces, now integrated in the Russian Tsardom by the capitulation of Estonia and Livonia.

Formation of a new anti-Swedish alliance 
After Poltava, Peter the Great and Augustus the Strong allied again in the Treaty of Thorn (1709); Frederick IV of Denmark-Norway with Augustus the Strong in the Treaty of Dresden (1709); and Russia with Denmark–Norway in the subsequent Treaty of Copenhagen. In the Treaty of Hanover (1710), Hanover, whose elector was to become George I of Great Britain, allied with Russia. In 1713, Brandenburg-Prussia allied with Russia in the Treaty of Schwedt. George I of Great Britain and Hanover concluded three alliances in 1715: the Treaty of Berlin with Denmark–Norway, the Treaty of Stettin with Brandenburg-Prussia, and the Treaty of Greifswald with Russia.

1709–1714: Ottoman Empire 

When his army surrendered, Charles XII of Sweden and a few soldiers escaped to Ottoman territory, founding a colony in front of Bender, Moldova. Peter I demanded Charles's eviction, and when the sultan refused, Peter decided to force it by invading the Ottoman Empire. However the ensuing Pruth River Campaign resulted in a disaster for the Russians as Peter's army was trapped by an Ottoman army at the Pruth river. However, Peter managed to negotiate a retreat, making a few territorial concessions and promising to withdraw his forces from the Holy Roman Empire as well as allowing Charles's return to Sweden. These terms were laid out in the Treaty of Adrianople (1713). Charles showed no interest in returning, established a provisional court in his colony, and sought to persuade the sultan to engage in an Ottoman-Swedish assault on Russia. The sultan put an end to the generous hospitality granted and had the king arrested in what became known as the "kalabalik" in 1713. Charles was then confined at Timurtash and Demotika; later he abandoned his hopes for an Ottoman front and returned to Sweden in a 14-day ride.

1710–1721: Finland 

The war between Russia and Sweden continued after the disaster of Poltava in 1709, though the shattered Swedish continental army could provide very little help. Russia captured Viborg (ru. Vyborg) in 1710 and successfully held it against Swedish attempts to retake the town in 1711. In 1712 the first Russian campaign to capture Finland began under the command of General Admiral Fyodor Apraksin. Apraksin gathered an army of 15,000 men at Vyborg and started the operation in late August. Swedish General Georg Henrik Lybecker chose not to face the Russians with his 7,500 men in the prepared positions close to Vyborg and instead withdrew west of Kymijoki river using scorched earth tactics. Apraksin's forces reached the river but chose not to cross it and instead withdrew back to Vyborg, likely due to problems in supply. Swedish efforts to maintain their defences were greatly hampered by the drain of manpower by the continental army and various garrisons around the Baltic Sea as well as by the plague outbreak that struck Finland and Sweden between 1710 and 1713, which devastated the land killing, amongst others, over half of the population of Helsingfors (Helsinki).

After the failure of 1712, Peter the Great ordered that further campaigns in war-ravaged regions of Finland with poor transportation networks were to be performed along the coastline and the seaways near the coast. Alarmed by the Russian preparations Lybecker requested naval units to be brought in as soon as possible in the spring of 1713. However, like so often, Swedish naval units arrived only after the initial Russian spring campaign had ended. Nominally under the command of Apraksin, but accompanied Peter the Great, a fleet of coastal ships together with 12,000 men—infantry and artillery—began the campaign by sailing from Kronstadt on 2 May 1713; a further 4,000 cavalry were later sent overland to join with the army. The fleet had already arrived at Helsinki on 8 May and were met by 1,800 Swedish infantry under General Carl Gustaf Armfeldt. Together with rowers from the ships the Russians had 20,000 men at their disposal even without the cavalry. The defenders, however, managed to fend off landing attempts by the attackers until the Russians landed at their flank at Sandviken, which forced Armfelt to retire towards Porvoo (Borgå) after setting afire both the town and all the supplies stored there as well as bridges leading north from the town. It was only on 12 May that Swedish squadron under Admiral Erik Johan Lillie made it to Helsinki but there was nothing it could do.

The bulk of the Russian forces moved along the coast towards Borgå and the forces of Lybecker, whom Armfelt had joined. On 21–22 May 1713 a Russian force of 10,000 men landed at Pernå (Pernaja) and constructed fortifications there. Large stores of supplies and munitions were transported from Vyborg and Saint Petersburg to the new base of operations. Russian cavalry managed to link up with the rest of the army there as well. Lybecker's army of 7000 infantry and 3000 cavalry avoided contact with the Russians and instead kept withdrawing further inland without even contesting the control of Borgå region or the important coastal road between Helsinki (Helsingfors) and Turku (Åbo). This also severed the contact between Swedish fleet and ground forces and prevented Swedish naval units from supplying it. Soldiers in the Swedish army who were mostly Finnish resented being repeatedly ordered to withdraw without even seeing the enemy. Lybecker was soon recalled to Stockholm for a hearing and Armfelt was ordered to the command of the army. Under his command the Swedish army in Finland stopped to engage the advancing Russians at Pälkäne in October 1713, where a Russian flanking manoeuvre forced him to withdraw to avoid getting encircled. The armies met again later at Napue in February 1714, where the Russians won a decisive victory.

In 1714 far greater Swedish naval assets were diverted towards Finland, which managed to cut the coastal sea route past Hangö cape already in early May 1714. This caused severe trouble for Russian supply route to Turku and beyond as supplies had to be carried overland. The Russian galley fleet arrived to the area on 29 June but stayed idle until 26–27 July when, under the leadership of Peter, Russian galleys managed to run the blockade making use of calm weather, which immobilized the Swedish battlefleet while losing only one galley of roughly 100. A small, hastily assembled Swedish coastal squadron met the Russian galley fleet west of Hangö cape in the Battle of Gangut and was overpowered by the Russians who had nearly ten-fold superiority. Russian breach of the blockade at Hangö forced the Swedish fleet to withdraw to prevent the Russian fleet from reaching Sweden itself. The Russian army occupied Finland mostly in 1713–1714, capturing Åland from where the population had already fled to Sweden on 13 August 1714. Since the Russian galley fleet was not able to raid the Swedish coast, with the exception of Umeå, which was plundered on 18 September, the fleet instead supported the advance of the Russian army, which led to hastily withdrawal by the Swedish army from Raahe (Brahestad) to Tornio (Torneå). The brutal occupation period of Finland in 1714–1721 is known as the Great Wrath.

1710–1716: Sweden and Northern Germany 

In 1710, the Swedish army in Poland retreated to Swedish Pomerania, pursued by the coalition. In 1711, siege was laid to Stralsund. Yet the town could not be taken due to the arrival of a Swedish relief army, led by general Magnus Stenbock, which secured the Pomeranian pocket before turning west to defeat an allied army in the Battle of Gadebusch. Pursued by coalition forces, Stenbock and his army was trapped and surrendered during the Siege of Tönning.

In 1714, Charles XII returned from the Ottoman Empire, arriving in Stralsund in November. In nearby Greifswald, already lost to Sweden, Russian tsar Peter the Great and British king George I, in his position as Elector of Hanover, had just signed an alliance on 17 (OS)/28 (NS) October. Previously a formally neutral party in the Pomeranian campaigns, Brandenburg-Prussia openly joined the coalition by declaring war on Sweden in the summer of 1715. Charles was then at war with much of Northern Europe, and Stralsund was doomed. Charles remained there until December 1715, escaping only days before Stralsund fell. When Wismar surrendered in 1716, all of Sweden's Baltic and German possessions were lost.

1716–1718: Norway 

After Charles XII had returned from the Ottoman Empire and resumed personal control of the war effort, he initiated two Norwegian Campaigns, starting in February 1716, to force Denmark–Norway into a separate peace treaty. Furthermore, he attempted to bar Great Britain access to the Baltic Sea. In search for allies, Charles XII also negotiated with the British Jacobite party. This resulted in Great Britain declaring war on Sweden in 1717. The Norwegian campaigns were halted and the army withdrawn when Charles XII was shot dead while besieging Norwegian Fredriksten on 30 November 1718 (OS). He was succeeded by his sister, Ulrika Eleonora.

1719–1721: Sweden 

After the death of Charles XII, Sweden still refused to make peace with Russia on Peter's terms. Despite a continued Swedish naval presence and strong patrols to protect the coast, small Russian raids took place in 1716 at Öregrund, while in July 1717 a Russian squadron landed troops at Gotland who raided for supplies. To place pressure on Sweden, Russia sent a large fleet to the Swedish east coast in July 1719. There, under protection of the Russian battlefleet, the Russian galley fleet was split into three groups. One group headed for the coast of Uppland, the second to the vicinity of Stockholm, and the last to coast of Södermanland. Together they carried a landing force of nearly 30,000 men. Raiding continued for a month and devastated amongst others the towns of Norrtälje, Södertälje, Nyköping and Norrköping, and almost all the buildings in the archipelago of Stockholm were burned. A smaller Russian force advanced on the Swedish capital but was stopped at the battle of Stäket on 13 August. Swedish and British fleets, now allied with Sweden, sailed from the west coast of Sweden but failed to catch the raiders.

After the treaty of Frederiksborg in early 1720, Sweden was no longer at war with Denmark, which allowed more forces to be placed against the Russians. This did not prevent Russian galleys from raiding the town of Umeå once again. Later in July 1720 a squadron from the Swedish battlefleet engaged the Russian galley fleet in the battle of Grengam. While the result of the battle is contested, it ended Russian galley raids in 1720. As negotiations for peace did not progress, the Russian galleys were once again sent to raid the Swedish coast in 1721, targeting primarily the Swedish coast between Gävle and Piteå.

Peace 

By the time of Charles XII's death, the anti-Swedish allies became increasingly divided on how to fill the power gap left behind by the defeated and retreating Swedish armies. George I and Frederik IV both coveted hegemony in northern Germany, while Augustus the Strong was concerned about the ambitions of Frederick William I on the southeastern Baltic coast. Peter the Great, whose forces were spread all around the Baltic Sea, envisioned hegemony in East Central Europe and sought to establish naval bases as far west as Mecklenburg. In January 1719, George I, Augustus and emperor Charles VI concluded a treaty in Vienna aimed at reducing Russia's frontiers to the pre-war limits.

Hanover-Great Britain and Brandenburg-Prussia thereupon negotiated separate peace treaties with Sweden, the treaties of Stockholm in 1719 and early 1720, which partitioned Sweden's northern German dominions among the parties. The negotiations were mediated by French diplomats, who sought to prevent a complete collapse of Sweden's position on the southern Baltic coast and assured that Sweden was to retain Wismar and northern Swedish Pomerania. Hanover gained Swedish Bremen-Verden, while Brandenburg-Prussia incorporated southern Swedish Pomerania.
Britain would briefly switch sides and supported Sweden before leaving the war.
In addition to the rivalries in the anti-Swedish coalition, there was an inner-Swedish rivalry between Charles Frederick, Duke of Holstein-Gottorp, and Frederick I of Hesse-Cassel for the Swedish throne. The Gottorp party succumbed and Ulrike Eleonora, wife of Frederick I, transferred power to her husband in May 1720. When peace was concluded with Denmark, the anti-Swedish coalition had already fallen apart, and Denmark was not in a military position to negotiate a return of its former eastern provinces across the sound. Frederick I was, however, willing to cede Swedish support for his rival in Holstein-Gottorp, which came under Danish control with its northern part annexed, and furthermore cede the Swedish privilege of exemption from the Sound Dues. A respective treaty was concluded in Frederiksborg in June 1720.

When Sweden finally was at peace with Hanover, Great Britain, Brandenburg-Prussia and Denmark–Norway, it hoped that the anti-Russian sentiments of the Vienna parties and France would culminate in an alliance that would restore its Russian-occupied eastern provinces. Yet, primarily due to internal conflicts in Great Britain and France, that did not happen. Therefore, the war was finally concluded by the Treaty of Nystad between Russia and Sweden in Uusikaupunki (Nystad) on 30 August 1721 (OS). Finland was returned to Sweden, while the majority of Russia's conquests (Swedish Estonia, Livonia, Ingria, Kexholm and a portion of Karelia) were ceded to the tsardom. Sweden's dissatisfaction with the result led to fruitless attempts at recovering the lost territories in the course of the following century, such as the Russo-Swedish War (1741–1743), and the Russo-Swedish War (1788–1790).

Saxe-Poland-Lithuania and Sweden did not conclude a formal peace treaty; instead, they renewed the Peace of Oliva that had ended the Second Northern War in 1660.

Sweden had lost almost all of its "overseas" holdings gained in the 17th century and ceased to be a major power. Russia gained its Baltic territories and became one of the greatest powers in Europe.

See also 
 Caroleans
 Military of the Swedish Empire
 Swedish army

References

Notes

Citations

Bibliography

Further reading 
 Bain, R. Nisbet. Charles XII and the Collapse of the Swedish Empire, 1682–1719 (1899) online
 Englund, Peter. Battle That Shook Europe: Poltava & the Birth of the Russian Empire (2003)
 Hatton, Ragnhild M. "Charles XII and the Great Northern War." in J.S. Bromley, ed., New Cambridge Modern History VI: The Rise of Great Britain and Russia 1688–1725 (1970) pp 648–80.
 Lisk, Jill. The struggle for supremacy in the Baltic, 1600–1725 (1968).
 Lunde, Henrik O. A Warrior Dynasty: The Rise and Decline of Sweden as a Military Superpower (Casemate, 2014).
 McKay, Derek, and H. M. Scott. The Rise of the Great Powers 1648–1815 (1983) pp 77–93.
 Moulton, James R. Peter the Great and the Russian Military Campaigns During the Final Years of the Great Northern War, 1719–1721 (University Press of America, 2005).
 Oakley, Stewart P. War and Peace in the Baltic, 1560–1790 (Routledge, 2005).
 
 Stiles, Andrina. Sweden and the Baltic 1523–1721 (Hodder & Stoughton, 1992).
 Wilson, Derek. "Poltava: The battle that changed the world." History Today 59.3 (2009): 23.

Other languages 
 Baskakov, Benjamin I. (1890) . The Northern War of 1700–1721. Campaign from Grodno to Poltava 1706–1709 at Runivers.ru in DjVu and PDF formats

 
 

 
18th-century conflicts
1700s conflicts
1710s conflicts
1720s conflicts
18th century in Denmark
18th century in Sweden
Poland–Sweden relations
Warfare of the Early Modern period
Wars involving Denmark
Wars involving the Dutch Republic
Wars involving England
Wars involving Great Britain
Wars involving Moldavia
Wars involving Norway
Wars involving the Ottoman Empire
Wars involving the Polish–Lithuanian Commonwealth
Wars involving Prussia
Wars involving Russia
Wars involving Saxony
Northern War, Great
Wars involving Wallachia
Wars involving the Duchy of Courland and Semigallia
1700 in Europe
1721 in Europe
1710s in Europe
Polish-Swedish war